"The Forgotten People" is a famous 1942 speech and campaign slogan by Robert Menzies, an Australian politician who was repeatedly chosen as Prime Minister of Australia by emphasising his links to ordinary non-elite citizens.

Overview
The speech, delivered on 22 May 1942, defines and exalts Australia's middle class, which Menzies termed "the forgotten people". Menzies used the speech to outline the values and constituency that would form the basis of the Liberal Party of Australia. Menzies had previously been  Prime Minister, as leader of the United Australia Party from 1939-1941. From 1942 onward, Menzies had maintained his public profile with his series of "Forgotten People" radio talks, similar to Franklin Roosevelt's "fireside chats" of the 1930s, in which he spoke of the middle class as the "backbone of Australia" but as nevertheless having been "taken for granted" by political parties and of being effectively powerless because of lack of wealth on the one hand, and lack of organisation on the other.

Cultural legacy
Contemporary Australian politicians continue to invoke Menzies' sentiments.

Labor leader Kevin Rudd made reference to the phrase and to Menzies in the lead-up to the 2007 federal election for a perceived current generation of "Forgotten People".

Liberal Opposition Leader Tony Abbott echoed the Menzian rhetoric in his first budget-reply speech to the Gillard Government in May 2011, addressing his remarks to the "forgotten families" of Australia.

After the Coalition lost the 2022 federal election and Peter Dutton became the Leader of the Opposition, he referred to this speech.

See also

"The light on the hill"

References

External links
Text of the speech at Australianpolitics.com

Political history of Australia
Liberal Party of Australia
Robert Menzies
1942 in Australia
1942 in politics
Australian political catchphrases
1942 speeches